King of the Wild Horses is a 1947 American Western film directed by George Archainbaud and starring Preston Foster, Gail Patrick and Billy Sheffield. Although the film shares its title with earlier films released in 1933 and 1924, it is not a remake.

Plot
The film centers on a young city boy named Billy who heads out to the Old West to live on a ranch bonds with a wild horse named Royal.

Cast
 Preston Foster as Dave Taggert
 Gail Patrick as Ellen Taggert
 Billy Sheffield as Tim Taggert (as Bill Sheffield)
 Guinn "Big Boy" Williams as Jed Acker (as Big Boy Williams)
 Patti Brady as Lolly Taggert
 Charles Kemper as Rudy 
 Robert 'Buzz' Henry as Cracker (as Buzz Henry)
 John Kellogg as Danny Taggert
 Ruth Warren as Jane Acker
 Louis Faust as Tex

See also
 List of American films of 1947

References

External links
 
 
 

1947 films
Films directed by George Archainbaud
American Western (genre) films
1947 Western (genre) films
Columbia Pictures films
1940s American films